Evergreen Cemetery gatehouse (1855) is a historic building located at 799 Baltimore Pike in Adams County, Pennsylvania. During the American Civil War, the gatehouse played an important role in the July 1 to 3, 1863 Battle of Gettysburg. It is a contributing structure in Gettysburg Battlefield Historic District.

History

Evergreen Cemetery

Evergreen Cemetery occupies a hill just south of Gettysburg Borough, between Baltimore Pike and Tanneytown Road. The Ever Green Cemetery Association of Gettysburg was chartered in 1853. It remains a private cemetery to this day.

Philadelphia architect Stephen Decatur Button designed the cemetery's gatehouse in mid-1855, and its cornerstone was laid by Reverend Samuel Simon Schmucker on September 1. Local masons George and Henry Chritzman constructed the brick building in less than 3 months, at a cost of $1,025. The gatehouse served as the cemetery's office, and as the residence of its caretaker.

Battle of Gettysburg

Recognizing the enormous strategic advantage of the cemetery's high ground, Major-General Oliver Otis Howard lined his artillery along what came to be known as "Cemetery Hill," facing north and west. On the opposite side of Baltimore Pike, his artillery faced north and east. Howard made the cemetery's gatehouse into XI Corps (Union Army) headquarters, and occupied the building for all three days of the battle.

On July 1, Gettysburg Borough was evacuated, and the telegraph key from Gettysburg Railroad Station was moved to near the gatehouse, to keep communications open. That night, Elizabeth Thorn, wife of the cemetery's caretaker, prepared a fine dinner for General Howard, General Sickles, and General Slocum.

At dusk on July 2, 5 Louisiana regiments under Brigadier-General Harry T. Hays and 3 North Carolina regiments under Colonel Isaac E. Avery commenced the Battle of East Cemetery Hill, charging the Union artillery batteries from the east. Historian Frederick Hawthorne wrote of Howard's successful defense: “Lying in reserve in the Evergreen Cemetery, they (73rd Pennsylvania Infantry) rushed out through the cemetery gateway to help drive the Confederates away from Rickett’s and Weidrich’s batteries.”

Post-battle
Evergreen Cemetery gatehouse survived the Battle of Gettysburg. In the battle's aftermath, Elizabeth Thorn buried approximately one hundred fallen soldiers in the vicinity. Structural repairs were made to the building in 1885, when the "lodge" addition was built. 

In 1972, the "Evergreen Cemetery archway house" was designated an historic district contributing structure by the Gettysburg Borough Council (1 of 38 outside of the borough).

References

 

Gettysburg Battlefield
American Civil War cemeteries
Arches and vaults
Cemetery Hill
Italianate architecture in Pennsylvania
Houses in Adams County, Pennsylvania
Gates in the United States
Gatehouses (architecture)
1855 establishments in Pennsylvania
Buildings and structures completed in 1855